Jacques Rousseau (c. 1925 – 2009) was a French slalom canoeist who competed in the late 1940s. He won two gold medals at the 1949 ICF Canoe Slalom World Championships in Geneva, earning them in the C-2 event and the C-2 team event.

References

1920s births
2009 deaths
French male canoeists
Medalists at the ICF Canoe Slalom World Championships